Kunle Soname is a Nigerian politician, entrepreneur, sport enthusiast and the chairman of Bet9ja, a betting website he founded in 2013. He is also the first Nigerian to acquire a European club C.D. Feirense which he bought in 2015. He is the Founder of the private Nigerian airline ValueJet (Nigeria)

Early life and education
Soname studied Estate Management at Obafemi Awolowo University where he graduated in 1988. He venture into politics in 2003 and was elected as the Executive Chairman of Ikosi-isheri Local Council a post he held till 2011.

Career
Remo Stars Football Club previously known as  FC DENDER was founded by Soname in 2004. The club was then relocated from Lagos State to Remo area of Ogun State, and is now playing in the Nigerian Premier League's Top Division.

Personal life
Soname is married to Kemi Soname and they have a daughter Erioluwa.

References

Nigerian politicians
Yoruba politicians
Lagos State University alumni
Year of birth missing (living people)
Living people